Apatopygus recens is a species of sea urchin of the family Apatopygidae. Their armour is covered with spines. It is placed in the genus Apatopygus and lives in the sea. Apatopygus recens was first scientifically described in 1836 by Milne-Edwards, French zoologist.

References 

Apatopygidae
Animals described in 1836
Taxa named by Henri Milne-Edwards